Sørarnøya or Sør-Arnøya is a small island in the municipality of Gildeskål in Nordland county, Norway. The  island is located west of the neighboring island of Sandhornøya and south of the island of Nordarnøya.

The population (2016) of the island is 199. The main village on the island is the village of Sør-Arnøy. The closest town to Sørarnøya is Bodø, to the north, which can be reached by boat.

See also
List of islands of Norway

References

Gildeskål
Islands of Nordland